Maple River Township is one of eighteen townships in Carroll County, Iowa, United States.  As of the 2000 census, its population was 510.

Geography
According to the USGS, it contains one cemetery, Saint Francis.

References

External links
 US-Counties.com
 City-Data.com

Townships in Carroll County, Iowa
Townships in Iowa